Tatyana Ragozina (born September 3, 1964) is a retired female race walker from Ukraine, who competed for her native country at the 1996 Summer Olympics in Atlanta, United States. She set her personal best (1:32:17) in the women's 20 km event on June 17, 2000 in Eisenhüttenstadt.

Achievements

References

Profile

1964 births
Living people
Ukrainian female racewalkers
Athletes (track and field) at the 1996 Summer Olympics
Olympic athletes of Ukraine